Hebeloma mediorufum is a species of mushroom in the family Hymenogastraceae.

mediorufum